Parkdale—High Park is a provincial electoral district in Toronto, Ontario, Canada, created in 1996 and represented in the Legislative Assembly of Ontario since 1999. It is located in the Toronto's west-end, bordering on the lakefront to the south, the Humber River to the west, and the Canadian Pacific Railway tracks essentially defining its northern and eastern borders. There are 107,035 residents in the district. Federally the electoral district is held by Member of Parliament (MP) Arif Virani, provincially by Member of Provincial Parliament (MPP) Bhutila Karpoche and municipally by city councillor Gord Perks (Ward 4).

Boundaries

2007 & 2011 elections

It consists of the part of the City of Toronto bounded on the south by Lake Ontario, on the west by the Humber River, and on the north and east by a line drawn from the Humber River east along the Canadian Pacific Railway, southeast along the Canadian National/Canadian Pacific Railway to Queen Street West, south along Dufferin Street to the Gardiner expressway; then westerly along said expressway to the southerly production of Spencer Street, and south along the Spencer production to the city limits in Lake Ontario. The boundary then moves westerly along the city limits to the production of the Humber River; then generally it moves northwesterly following the river back to the commencement point at the intersection of the river and the railway tracks.

1999, 2003, 2006 elections
The district was constituted from parts of the old City of Toronto and the former City of York. It started at the intersection of the westerly limit of the City of York with the Canadian Pacific Railway; then went easterly along the railway to the Canadian National Railway; from there it went southeasterly along the Canadian National Railway to the northerly production of Atlantic Avenue; then southerly along said production, Atlantic Avenue and its southerly production to the Gardiner Expressway; thence westerly along the Gardiner Expressway to the southerly production of Spencer Avenue; then southerly along the southerly production of Spencer Avenue to the southerly limit of the City of Toronto in Lake Ontario. The boundary then moves westerly along the city limits to the production of the Humber River; then generally it moves northwesterly following the river back to the commencement point at the intersection of the river and the railway tracks.

Neighbourhoods
Parkdale—High Park encompasses seven neighbourhoods surrounding High Park. Including the park and portions west, between the north and south borders of the park is the neighbourhood of Swansea; north of the park are the neighbourhoods of High Park North and the south half of The Junction; north-west of the park are the neighbourhoods of Runnymede-Bloor West Village and Lambton Baby Point; to the east of the park is Roncesvalles; and Parkdale directly to the south and to the south-east.

History
Parkdale—High Park was created in 1996 when provincial districts were defined to have the same borders as federal electoral districts.  It had previously been represented by portions of the High Park—Swansea, Parkdale, and York South districts.

Gerard Kennedy, a member of the Ontario Liberal Party, was the first MPP elected from this district, after he won the seat in the 1999 Ontario general election. He was re-elected in the subsequent 2003 Ontario general election that elected a Liberal majority government. Kennedy served as Minister of Education in that government until he resigned in 2006 to run for the federal Liberal Party leadership, precipitating the September 14, 2006 by-election that was won by DiNovo.

Cheri DiNovo, a member of the New Democratic Party (NDP), became the district's MPP after the September 14, 2006 by-election caused by Kennedy's resignation from the Legislature. DiNovo was re-elected in the 2007, 2011 and 2014 Ontario general elections before retiring from politics in 2017 to become minister of Trinity-St. Paul's United Church.

Members of Provincial Parliament

Election results

2007 electoral reform referendum

References

Notes

Citations

External links
Elections Ontario Past Election Results

External links
Parkdale—High Park Green Party
Parkdale—High Park Liberal Party
Parkdale—High Park NDP Riding Association
Parkdale—High Park Ontario Progressive Conservative Party Riding Association
Map of riding for 2018 election

Provincial electoral districts of Toronto